Kikar Singh (born 26 August 1939) is an Indian politician. He was a Member of Parliament, representing Bathinda, Punjab in the Lok Sabha the lower house of India's Parliament as a member of the Akali Dal (Sant Group).

References

External links
Official biographical sketch in Parliament of India website

1939 births
Living people
Lok Sabha members from Punjab, India
Shiromani Akali Dal politicians
India MPs 1967–1970